Eudrilus is a genus of annelids belonging to the family Eudrilidae.

Species:

Eudrilus boyeri 
Eudrilus butteri
Eudrilus decipiens 
Eudrilus erudiens 
Eudrilus jullieni 
Eudrilus kamerunensis 
Eudrilus lacazii 
Eudrilus milliemosbyae 
Eudrilus pallidus 
Eudrilus peregrinus 
Eudrilus roseus 
Eudrilus simplex 
Eudrilus sodeindei 
Eudrilus sylvicola

References

Clitellata
Annelid genera